Regla Leyén Zulueta (born 3 November 1979) is a female judoka from Cuba, who won the gold medal in the women's middleweight division (– 70 kg) at the 2003 Pan American Games in Santo Domingo, Dominican Republic. In the final she defeated USA's Christina Yannetsos. In 2003, she immigrated to United States and in 2010 she became a U.S. citizen.

References

External links
 

1979 births
Living people
Cuban female judoka
Pan American Games gold medalists for Cuba
Pan American Games medalists in judo
Judoka at the 2003 Pan American Games
Medalists at the 2003 Pan American Games
20th-century Cuban women
21st-century Cuban women